is a railway station in the city of Anjō, Aichi, Japan, operated by Meitetsu.

Lines

Station layout
The station  has a single side platform for bi-directional traffic. The station is unattended.

Adjacent stations

Station history
Hekikai Furui Station was opened on July 1, 1926 as a station on the privately Hekikai Electric Railway. Hekikai Electric Railway merged with the Meitetsu Group on May 1, 1944. The station was closed in 1944, but was reopened on October 1, 1952.

Passenger statistics
In fiscal 2017, the station was used by an average of 1,189 passengers daily (boarding passengers only).

Surrounding area
Furui Jinja

See also
 List of Railway Stations in Japan

References

External links

 Official web page 

Railway stations in Japan opened in 1926
Railway stations in Aichi Prefecture
Stations of Nagoya Railroad
Anjō, Aichi